The 2010 Dantewada bus bombing occurred on 17 May 2010 when a bus hit a landmine 50 km away from Dantewada, in Chhattisgarh's Dantewada district. Fatalities reports range from 31 to 44, including several Special Police Officers (SPOs) and civilians.

It was the first Naxal attack to target a civilian bus. The attack occurred one month after Dantewada witnessed the worst-ever massacre of CRPF jawans, when 76 troops were killed in the April 2010 Maoist attack in Dantewada.

References

21st-century mass murder in India
Naxalite–Maoist insurgency
Bus bombings in Asia
History of Chhattisgarh (1947–present)
Improvised explosive device bombings in India
Mass murder in 2010
Terrorist incidents in India in 2010
Massacres in India
Manmohan Singh administration
Crime in Chhattisgarh
Communist terrorism